Chrysostomos I can refer to:

 Chrysostomos I of Athens (1868–1938), Archbishop of Athens and All Greece, 1923–1938
 Chrysostomos I of Cyprus (1927–2007), Archbishop of Cyprus, 1977–2007